Greilickville is an unincorporated community and census-designated place (CDP) in Leelanau County in the U.S. state of Michigan. At the 2020 census, the population was 1,634, up from 1,530 at the 2010 census. The community is located within Elmwood Charter Township, and is located in the extreme southeast of the Leelanau Peninsula.

The community is located on the western shore of the West Arm of Grand Traverse Bay, a bay of Lake Michigan. Greilickville is immediately northwest of Traverse City, and is part of that city's urban area. Greilickville is the largest community in Leelanau County by population.

History
The Greilickville area was settled by Godfrey Greilick and his family in 1856, recently emmigrating from Bohemia. Greilick operated a number of sawmills in southeast Leelanau County. In 1875, brothers Albert and Seth H. Norris established a settlement on the shore of Grand Traverse Bay consisting of a grist mill, tannery, brickyard, and pottery factory, as well as a post office with the name Norrisville. The post office lasted from September of 1881 to June of 1882, and again from May of 1884 to July of 1902. In 1874, James W. Markham purchased the Norris' brickyard, expanding it and establishing commercial service. Markham Bricks, renowned for their pale yellow color derived from sediments in Cedar Lake, was supplied to build much of nearby Traverse City and the Traverse City State Hospital.

In 1893, an extension of the Manistee and North-Eastern Railroad was opened through the community, with a station named Greilickville, in honor of Godfrey Greilick. The community later took on the name. In the early 20th century, Greilickville transitioned to a tourism-based economy, and established itself as a convenient location for tall ships to drop off tourists to the region.

In 1961, when Greilickville's population was about 900, a special election was held in sections 28 and 33 of Elmwood Township, including Greilickville, to decide a proposal regarding making those areas a home-rule village called Elmwood. The proposal was defeated by a vote of 238 to 88.

In 1995, the Leelanau Trail, a public rail trail, opened on the right-of-way of the former Manistee and North-Eastern Railroad.

Geography
Greilickville is in the southeastern corner of Leelanau County and of Elmwood Charter Township. It is bordered to the south by Traverse City in Grand Traverse County and to the east by the West Arm of Grand Traverse Bay, part of Lake Michigan. The CDP extends north to the north end of Cedar Lake and west to Bugai Road. Michigan highway M-22 runs through the east side of Greilickville along the shore of Grand Traverse Bay, leading south into Traverse City and north  to Suttons Bay.

Major highway 

  is a north–south route that parallels the shore of Grand Traverse Bay. The route is popular among tourists, and can be used to access Traverse City, to the south, and Suttons Bay and Northport to the north. South of Greilickville, M-22 reaches junctions with US 31, M-37, and M-72.

Demographics

At of the 2000 census, there were 1,415 people, 624 households and 431 families residing in the CDP. The racial makeup of the CDP was 97.95% White, 0.64% African American, 0.35% Native American, 0.07% Asian, 0.21% from other races, and 0.78% from two or more races. Hispanic or Latino of any race were 0.57% of the population.

There were 624 households, of which 21.5% had children under the age of 18 living with them, 59.5% were married couples living together, 7.2% had a female householder with no husband present, and 30.8% were non-families. 25.3% of all households were made up of individuals, and 12.8% had someone living alone who was 65 years of age or older.  The average household size was 2.27 and the average family size was 2.67.

18.2% of the population were under the age of 18, 4.8% from 18 to 24, 21.3% from 25 to 44, 31.0% from 45 to 64, and 24.7% who were 65 years of age or older. The median age was 48 years. For every 100 females, there were 90.2 males. For every 100 females age 18 and over, there were 87.8 males.

The median household income was $48,269 and the median family income was $51,250. Males had a median income of $45,938 compared with $27,938 for females. The per capita income for the CDP was $30,822. None of the families and 1.2% of the population were living below the poverty line, including no under eighteens and 1.8% of those over 64.

Climate 
This climatic region has large seasonal temperature differences, with warm to hot (and often humid) summers and cold (sometimes severely cold) winters.  According to the Köppen Climate Classification system, Greilickville has a humid continental climate, abbreviated "Dfb" on climate maps.

Education 
Greilickville is served by Traverse City Area Public Schools (TCAPS). The community is zoned to Traverse City West Senior High School, in nearby Garfield Township. Until 2008, Norris Elementary School, operated by TCAPS, served elementary students in southeast Leelanau County. Today, elementary students in Greilickville are zoned to Willow Hill Elementary School, in Traverse City. The Pathfinder School, an private PreK–8 school, is located within Greilickville.

References

Further reading
Clarke Historical Library, Central, Michigan University, Bibliography for Leelanau County

External links
Michigan Historical Marker

Unincorporated communities in Leelanau County, Michigan
Census-designated places in Michigan
Traverse City micropolitan area
1853 establishments in Michigan
Populated places established in 1853
Unincorporated communities in Michigan
Census-designated places in Leelanau County, Michigan